24 horas (24 hours) was a Mexican television news programme broadcast from 1970 to 1998, presented by Jacobo Zabludovsky. It aired on el Canal de las Estrellas from Televisa for 27 years, starting from September 7, 1970. It was the longest running news show on Mexican TV, with almost three uninterrupted decades of broadcasting; it stopped airing on Monday, January 19, 1998, even though Zabludovsky continued working on Televisa until the year 2000. It was a very influential show, considering that it was the most watched news show in Mexico.

The news show was the first to be produced by a news team from the same network, without newspaper articles.

Journalists and collaborators 
Many renowned Mexican journalists and newsreader started their career on this show. Examples include:

Jacobo Zabludovsky†
Joaquín López-Dóriga
Ricardo Rocha Reynaga
Juan Ruiz Healy
Lolita Ayala
Heriberto Murrieta
Fernando Schwartz
Guillermo Ortega Ruiz
Abraham Zabludovsky Nerubay
Juan Manuel Damián

Journalists 

Graciela Leal
Luis Aguilar Chávez†
Salvador Estrada
Guillermo Pérez Verduzco†
Fernando Alcalá
Juan Manuel Rentería
Patricia Donneaud
Norma Meraz
Félix Cortés Camarillo
Gregorio Meraz
Guillermo Herrera
Rita Ganem†
Laura Padilla
Agustín Granados
Ana Cristina Peláez
Juan José Prado
Juan Francisco Castañeda
Francisco Ramírez
Fernando del Monte Ceceña
Magdalena García de León
Philippe Bac
Amador Narcia
Rocío Villagarcía
Laura Martínez Alarcón
Rafael Vieyra Matouk
Virginia Sendel-Lemaitre
Martha Venegas
Helen Sztrigler
Cynthia Lara
Ma. Cristina Espinoza
Julieta Berganza
Silvia Lemus
Maxine Woodside
Talina Fernández
Martha Renero
Francisco Patiño
Elda Sánchez Gaytán
Alejandro Llano
José María Rebolledo
Salvador Carrillo Martínez
Rocío González Trápaga
Raúl René Trujillo
Ricardo Peña Navarrete
Héctor Jaime Mendoza
Primitivo López
Juan Sebastián Solís
Susana Solís

Correspondents 

Valentina Alazraki (Italy and the Vatican)
Philippe Bac (Canada and France)
Félix Cortés Schöler (Germany)
Ignacio Espinoza (Miami-USA)
Jesús Hermida (Washington)
Federico Knoblauch (Germany)
Mario Lechuga (Texas-USA)
María Almendra McBride
Marcelo Luis Ojeda (Argentina)
Alberto Peláez (Spain)
Joaquín Peláez
María Elena Rico (Soviet Union/Russia)
Horacio Rocha Staines (Great Britain)
Eva Usi (Germany)
Erica Vexler (Israel)
Ariel Roffe (Israel)
Kassia Wyderko (Yugoslavia)
Marissa Céspedes (New York)
José Luis Belmar (Sweden)

After the final broadcasts of 24 horas, most of the correspondents continued to work on the new worldwide information program of Televisa, being part of Noticieros Televisa, such as Alazraki, Belmar, Céspedes, Pelaez, and Wyderko.  Later, some correspondents were replaced.

References

Mexican television news shows
1970 Mexican television series debuts
1998 Mexican television series endings
1970s Mexican television series
1980s Mexican television series
1990s Mexican television series
Televisa original programming
Las Estrellas original programming